FanSided is a fandom-focused sports, lifestyle and entertainment network of more than 300 websites, newsletters and a mobile app. It was co-founded and launched in 2009 by brothers Zach Best and Adam Best. FanSided is owned by Minute Media and is headquartered in Chicago, Illinois.

History
The idea of FanSided was born in 2007 when brothers Adam and Zach Best co-founded a Kansas City Chiefs blog called Arrowhead Addict. The FanSided network was officially launched in 2009.

Over time, the site expanded to include other professional sports, as well as more topics, including general news, entertainment, lifestyle and fandoms like Game of Thrones, The Walking Dead, and Star Wars.

Matt Blake joined the company as a partner and chief product officer in 2011. Both Matt Blake and Zach Best serve as co-CEOs of FanSided.

FanSided, including its mobile app and newsletter, was acquired by Time Inc. on May 26, 2015. The acquisition was intended to expand Sports Illustrated's local sports coverage and financial details of the agreement were not disclosed. Under Time Inc.'s ownership, founders Adam and Zach Best continued to oversee FanSided as a division of the Sports Illustrated Group.

On March 2, 2017, Adam Best announced his departure from the company.

On January 31, 2018, Time Inc. was acquired by Meredith Corporation, which assumed ownership of all of Time Inc.’s media brands, including FanSided.

In January 2020, FanSided was sold to Minute Media by Meredith Corporation. The acquisition was intended to allow Minute Media to target fans of specific teams.

Burt Gertson/Mia Khalifa controversy
On September 29, 2016, FanSided columnist Burt Gertson and former adult film actress Mia Khalifa, who was writing for FanSided at the time, engaged in a Twitter argument. After initially claiming via email that Gertson was a real person, FanSided later tweeted that the Gertson account was a fictional person aimed at providing satire. On October 1, 2016, FanSided issued a statement on the termination of those involved, including editor-in-chief Jim Cavan.

Partnerships
In August 2012, FanSided partnered with Sports Illustrated. The partnership offered Sports Illustrated an opportunity to expand its local sports coverage and reach new customers via FanSided's digital network. As part of the partnership, Sports Illustrated'''s website featured links to content on FanSided websites. Time Inc. also sold ads on the FanSided websites with revenue shared between the two entities.

 Projects 

 FanSided Fan of the Year 
On November 6, 2015, in conjunction with Sports Illustrated, FanSided announced the FanSided Fan of the Year contest. The annual contest is aimed at recognizing the most dedicated sports fans. The five finalists are interviewed and profiled on FanSided.com and receive a one-year subscription to Sports Illustrated. The grand prize winner is featured in Sports Illustrated.

 FanSided Fandom of the Year 
On November 1, 2016, FanSided announced Fandom 250, a subjective ranking of the best 250 fandoms in the world. The yearly ranking is assembled by a panel of experts who evaluate more than 500 fandoms across multiple categories, including sports, technology, entertainment, lifestyle and more. The fandoms are evaluated based on their size, longevity, economic and media impact, as well as the passion of its fans.Burgess, Janita "This Week in Fandom, Volume 66", Organization for Transformative Works, November 14, 2017. In 2021, FanSided renamed the project the FanSided Fandom of the Year.

 FanSiders of the Year 
On February 7, 2020, FanSided announced its first annual FanSider of the Year Awards'', recognizing the best of the best at FanSided. The inaugural FanSiders of the Year for 2019 included:

 NFL Expert (Editor) of the Year Brad Weiss
 NCAA Experts (Editors) of the Year Jacob Lane and Presley Meyer
 NFL Contributor (Writer) of the Year Chris Wilson
 NCAA Contributor (Writer) of the Year Zach Bigalke

Traffic 
As of December 2019, comScore put FanSided traffic at 23.5 million unique visitors per month.

References

External links
 

American companies established in 2007
Companies based in Chicago
American entertainment websites
Internet properties established in 2009